A Promise is a 1974 album by Miriam Makeba. David Axelrod was responsible for the string arrangements.

Track listing
All tracks composed by Angela Makeba and Caiphus Semenya; except where indicated
"Hauteng"	4:50
"Mama Ndiyalila"	3:26
"We Got To Make It"	4:10
"Mama"	4:22
"Promise"	4:44
"Mo Lou Yame" (Traditional)	4:04
"Laguine Guine" (Angela Makeba, Caiphus Semenya, Sekou Kanté)	3:15
"Samba"	5:05
"Quit It" (Traditional)	4:00

References

1974 albums
Miriam Makeba albums